Ajeya is a 1985 Indian Kannada language romantic film directed and co-produced by Siddalingaiah and based on the novel of the same name written by B. L. Venu. The film starred his son Murali and Sandhya in the lead roles. The film has a score and soundtrack composed by Ilaiyaraaja. The film was remade in Tamil by the same director as Puthir in 1986 with Murali reprising his role.

Cast
 Murali
 Sandhya
 Leelavathi
 Doddanna
 Ashalatha
 Anuradha
 Vijay Kashi
 Rajaram

Soundtrack
All the songs are composed and scored by Ilaiyaraaja, with the lyrics by Doddarangegowda and Shyamsundar Kulkarni.

References

External links 
 

1985 films
1980s Kannada-language films
Films based on Indian novels
Indian romance films
Films scored by Ilaiyaraaja
Kannada films remade in other languages
Films directed by Siddalingaiah
1980s romance films